Hot lap is a term that is associated with some sports.

In motor racing
A 'hot lap', also called a 'flying lap' or a 'timed lap', is a complete lap around a racetrack that takes place in free practice or qualification, the time of which is recorded. In general, when hot lapping, the goal is to achieve the fastest possible time around the circuit. During practice, this may just be to achieve a personal record, or a track record. In qualification, it would be to get the best possible starting grid position.

In Courtmacsherry
Karen Bevan used a hot lap to win the 2020 Courtmacsherry 10k road race.

In ice hockey
Hot-lapping may also refer to a superstitious routine that ice hockey players, and sometimes other team personnel, perform hours before a game for good luck, in which one skates around the perimeter of the rink alone.  For example, the Washington Capitals have employed hot-lapping in preparation for games during their 2018 Stanley Cup championship run, as well as their Stanley Cup Finals opponent, the Vegas Golden Knights.

Outside of sports

Hot lapping may also refer to the act of drawing attention to one self at the expense of another person's life, particularly through eulogies or social media posts.

References

External links
Examples of Hot Lap experiences in New Zealand

Motorsport terminology